A milestone is a marker of distance along roads.

Milestone may also refer to:

Measurements
Milestone (project management), metaphorically, markers of reaching an identifiable stage in any task or the project
Software release life cycle state, see Pre-alpha
Developmental milestones, tasks most children can perform at certain ages

Geography
Milestone (Arlington, Massachusetts), a historic milestone in Arlington, Massachusetts
Milestone (electoral district), a former provincial electoral district for the Legislative Assembly of Saskatchewan, Canada
Milestone, County Tipperary, a village in Ireland
Milestone, Saskatchewan, Canada
Milestone, Virginia, United States

Literature
Milestones (play), a 1912 play by Arnold Bennett and Edward Knoblock
 Milestones (book), a 1964 book by Egyptian Islamist Sayyid Qutb
Milestones I (1983) and Milestones II (1985), by Jack Chambers
Milestones (magazine), a Christadelphian magazine

Film and TV
Milestones (1916 film), British silent drama film based on the Arnold Bennett play
Milestones (1920 film), American silent drama film based on the Arnold Bennett play
Milestones (1975 film), by Robert Kramer and John Douglas

Music
Milestone Records, a jazz record label

Bands
Milestones (Austrian band), a 1970s Austrian band
The Milestones, a 1990s Pakistani band
Milestones (British band), a British pop rock band

Albums
Stan Kenton's Milestones, by Stan Kenton, 1950
Milestones (Miles Davis album), 1958
Milestones (Rolling Stones album), 1972
Milestones (Roy Orbison album), 1973
Milestones (Great Jazz Trio album), 1978
Milestone (Gideon album), 2012
Milestones (Riff Regan album), 2015
Milestone (Chrisette Michele album), 2016

Milestone (Lead album), 2018

Songs
"Milestones", a 1947 John Lewis composition credited to Miles Davis
"Milestones" (instrumental composition), by Miles Davis from the 1958 album of the same name
"Milestone" (song), by BoA

Brands and enterprises
Milestone (herbicide), a Dow AgroSciences brand name for aminopyralid
Milestone Films, an American film distributor
MileStone Inc., a Japanese arcade video game developer
Milestone Media, an American comic book publisher
Milestone (Italian company), an Italian video game developer
Milestones Grill and Bar, a Canadian restaurant chain
Motorola Milestone, a GSM version of the Android-based smartphone
Motorola Milestone 2, a GSM version of the Android-based smartphone
Milestones (video game), a 1981 video game

People with the surname
Lewis Milestone (1895–1980), Russian-American film director